Earl Judson Isaac (7 August 1921 – 12 December 1983) founded Fair, Isaac and Company along with friend William R. "Bill" Fair in 1956. They began the operation in a small studio apartment on Lincoln Avenue in San Rafael, California.

Early life and education
Earl Isaac was born in Buffalo, New York. The youngest of five children, Earl had two older brothers and two older sisters.  He graduated from high school at age 15, attended Muskingum University, then accepted an appointment in the United States Naval Academy at Annapolis, Maryland, for the class of 1944. Because of the outbreak World War II, he graduated from the Naval Academy in 1943, one year early, and served as a U.S. Naval officer on the USS Missouri.  After World War II, Earl earned a Master of Science degree in Mathematics at University of California, Los Angeles.

Career
After being discharged from the Navy, he worked at SRI International during SRI's beginning years, then known as Stanford Research Institute, along with Bill Fair, his future business partner.

With an initial investment of $400 each, Isaac and Fair founded Fair, Isaac and Company in 1956, a firm that would provide a creditworthiness scoring system to lenders.

References 
Notes

Bibliography
 View Points Special Issue — The Fair Isaac Company, January 1986, written by William R. Fair. (article is not online)

External links 
FICO - About Us - History

American computer programmers
1921 births
1983 deaths
20th-century American mathematicians
20th-century American businesspeople
 United States Navy officers
United States Naval Academy alumni
SRI International people
Muskingum University alumni
 People from Buffalo, New York
Businesspeople from Buffalo, New York
United States Navy personnel of World War II